Wilhelm Loock (born 14 January 1987) is a South African rugby union footballer. He plays mostly as a winger.

He represented the Pumas in the Currie Cup and Vodacom Cup until 2013, having previously played for the Maties in the Varsity Cup.

References

External links

itsrugby.co.uk profile

Living people
1987 births
South African rugby union players
Rugby union wings
Pumas (Currie Cup) players
Stellenbosch University alumni
People from George, South Africa
Rugby union players from the Western Cape